A wildlife biologist studies animals and their behavior along with the role each animal plays in its natural habitat. The duties of a wildlife biologist can include: developing and conducting experiments/studies on animals in their natural habitats, studying the characteristics of animals such as their interaction with different species, their reproductive and movement patterns, the dynamic within a population, and the transmission of diseases. Wildlife biologists can also play important roles in managing and monitoring population dynamics to preserve certain species and/or environments. They observe how animals interact with one another as well as how they interact with humans. Some wildlife biologists study the impacts of human interference on an ecosystem. Wildlife biologists can work with endangered species, advocate for preservation of wildlife, resolve issues pertaining to wildlife, and manage animal populations.

Education 
Educational requirements for wildlife biologists typically include tertiary education, such as a bachelor's degree in wildlife biology, zoology, wildlife ecology, or general biology. Many universities offer specialist degrees or courses in wildlife biology. Career progression into research or university-based roles will usually require relevant doctoral qualifications.

Annual pay 

In the United States, the average pay for a wildlife biologist is $62,290 per year or $29.95 per hour. The top 10% of wildlife biologists can earn up to $99,700 a year. According to the US Department of Labor, employment of wildlife biologists and zoologists is predicted to increase by 8% between  2016 and 2026, which is similar to the projected rate of increase in other occupations.

Specialized wildlife biologist 

 Entomologists - study of insects
Arachnologists - study of spiders and related animals, such as scorpions, pseudoscorpions, and harvestmen, collectively called arachnids
 Herpetologists - study of amphibians and reptiles
 Ichthyologists - study of fish
 Mammalogists - study of mammals
Primatologist - study of primates
Marine mammalogist - study of marine mammals
Cetologists - study of whales
 Ornithologists - study of birds
Marine biologists - study of marine animals

References